Zeba is a famous Pakistani film actress.

Zeba may also refer to:

Persons 
 Zeba Ali, Pakistani television actress and model
 Zeba Bakhtiar, Pakistani film and television actress and director

Others 
 Zeba Magazine
 Zeba, Michigan, a hamlet in the United States
 Zêba, a village in Tibet
 Zebah and Zalmunna, kings of Midian in the Book of Judges